Francisco de Assis Clarentino Valentim, shortly Valentim (born 20 June 1977) is a Brazilian footballer, who played as a midfielder.

Career
He played South Korean side FC Seoul in 2004.

References

External links
 

1977 births
Living people
Association football midfielders
Brazilian footballers
Brazilian expatriate footballers
Rio Branco Esporte Clube players
Campinense Clube players
Paysandu Sport Club players
Paraná Clube players
CR Flamengo footballers
Esporte Clube Juventude players
Fortaleza Esporte Clube players
Joinville Esporte Clube players
FC Seoul players
K League 1 players
Expatriate footballers in South Korea
Brazilian expatriate sportspeople in South Korea